Lewis Warrington may refer to:
 Lewis Warrington (United States Navy officer), officer during the Barbary Wars and the War of 1812
 Lewis Warrington (Medal of Honor), American officer in the U.S. Army 
 Lewis Warrington (footballer), English footballer